Highway 57 and Provincial Trunk Highway 57 (PTH 57) are two short highways in the Canadian provinces of Saskatchewan and Manitoba.

Route description
After crossing the provincial boundary, the highway travels for a short distance within Duck Mountain Provincial Forest before ending at PTH 83. 

Highway 57/PTH 57 is the main route through Duck Mountain Provincial Park. Kamsack Beach and Ministik Beach, located along Madge Lake, are accessible from the highway.

The speed limit is 100 km/h (62.5 mph) outside of Duck Mountain Provincial Park and 80 km/h (50 mph) within the park limits.

Major intersections
From west to east:

References

External links

 Duck Mountain Provincial Park

057
057